Eois oressigenes is a moth in the  family Geometridae. It is found in the Democratic Republic of Congo.

References

Moths described in 1921
Eois
Moths of Africa